Blepharomastix caulealis is a moth in the family Crambidae. It was described by William Schaus in 1924. It is found in Guatemala.

The wingspan is about 20 mm. The forewings are brown and the hindwings are semihyaline white, the termen suffused with brown.

References

Moths described in 1924
Blepharomastix
Moths of Central America